Six ships of the Royal Navy have been named HMS Colossus:
  was a 74-gun  third rate ship of the line launched in 1787 and wrecked in 1798.
  was a 74-gun third rate ship of the line launched in 1803.  She fought at Trafalgar and was broken up in 1826.
  was an 80-gun second rate ship of the line launched in 1848. She was converted to screw propulsion in 1854 and sold in 1867.
  was a  battleship launched in 1882 and sold in 1908.
  was a  dreadnought battleship launched in 1910. She fought at the Battle of Jutland and was scrapped in 1928. 
  was a  light aircraft carrier launched in 1943. She was loaned to France in 1946 and renamed Arromanches. She was bought by France in 1951 and was scrapped in 1978.

Royal Navy ship names